The Society for Technical Communication (STC) is a professional association dedicated to the advancement of the theory and practice of technical communication with more than 4,500 members in the United States, Canada, and the world. The society publishes a quarterly journal and a magazine eight times a year and hosts an annual international conference (STC Technical Communication Summit).  STC also provides online education in the form of live Web seminars, multi-week online certificate courses, virtual conferences, recorded seminars, and more.

Overview
Headquartered in Fairfax, Virginia, US, STC is the largest organization of its type in the world according to its website. It includes 50 chapters, 12 Special Interest Groups (SIGs), and over 4,500 members worldwide. STC members work in a wide range of roles, including:

Technical writing
Editing
Consulting
Content development
Education 
Environmental safety and health communication
Graphic arts 
Human factors 
Indexing
Information architecture
Instructional design
Management
Photography
Single source publishing
Software development 
Technical illustration
Translation
Usability 
Visual design
Web design

Most STC members belong to one or more communities, which are either geographic chapters or special interest groups (SIGs). Most chapters are in the United States, but STC includes members from 14 countries. The largest group outside the U.S. is the chapter in Toronto, Ontario, Canada.

STC publishes a quarterly journal, Technical Communication, and a monthly magazine, Intercom.

History
The organization traces its roots to the Society of Technical Writers (STW) in Boston and the Association of Technical Writers and Editors (ATWE) in New York. Both were founded in the United States in 1953. These organizations merged in 1957 to form the Society of Technical Writers and Editors (STWE). In 1960, this group merged with the Technical Publishing Society (TPS), based in Los Angeles,  to become the Society of Technical Writers and Publishers. In 1971, the organization's name was changed to the Society for Technical Communication.

The organization's main journal developed from the TWE Journal to the STWE Review to the STWP Review to Technical Communications to Technical Communication. Editors of this journal have included Douglas E. Knight, Allan H. Lytel, A. Stanley Higgins, Frank R. Smith, George Hayhoe, and Menno de Jong.

Other important leaders in the history of STC include Robert T. Hamlett (first president of ATWE), A. E. Tyler (first president of TPS), Samuel A. Miles (president of the Society of Technical Writers and Editors, which became ATWE's New York chapter in 1955), Vernon R. Root, Robert O. Shockney, and Stello Jordan. In 2011, Alan Houser was elected vice president of the organization; per their by-laws, he became president in 2012, and was succeeded by his own vice president Nicky Bleiel in 2013.

STC's annual publications competition for 2012-2013 was held in Washington, D.C. The organization also has branches internationally. On November 12, 2012, STC's branch in India held its 14th annual conference in Bangalore.

Technical Communication Summit (Annual Conference)
In May or June of each year, STC holds the Technical Communication Summit, the largest conference for technical communicators in the world. The Summit includes over 80 education session broken up into relevant subject areas or tracks; networking events such as the Opening General Session, Welcome Reception, Communities Reception, and Closing Lunch; an Honors Banquet; and an exhibit hall with dozens of companies offering technical communication products or services. The Summit also includes preconference education for an additional price.

Other education
In addition to the Technical Communication Summit, STC offers online education both to its members and nonmembers, with members receiving discounted registration rates. STC offers both live and recorded online education.

STC Honors
STC recognizes outstanding individuals by conferring the titles of Fellow, Associate Fellow, and Honorary Fellow. STC's Honorary Fellow for 2009 was "Jimmy Wales, the co-founder of Wikipedia."

STC also sponsors honorary societies for technical communication students with a grade point average of 3.5 or above: 
 Sigma Tau Chi recognizes students in four-year or graduate programs
 Alpha Sigma recognizes students in two-year or certificate programs

See also

 American Medical Writers Association
 Council of Science Editors
 IEEE Professional Communication Society
 SIGDOC, the Special Interest Group on Design of Communication of the Association for Computing Machinery (ACM)
 Technical communication
 Technical writer
 Technical writing
 Wikiversity Technical Writing course

References

External links
Society for Technical Communications
Technical Writing Education Programs – Los Angeles Chapter, Society for Technical Communication (LASTC)
Guide to the Society for Technical Communication Records 1956–1996

Technical communication
Professional associations based in the United States